WDFB (1170 AM) is a radio station  broadcasting a Religious format. Licensed to Junction City, Kentucky, United States, the station serves the Daytime Only area.  The station is currently owned by Alum Springs Vision & Outreach Corp.

References

External links

DFB
Radio stations established in 1992
DFB